Rebecca Louise Herisssone  (born 12 June 1971) is Professor of Musicology at the University of Manchester.

Biography
Herissone has a Master of Arts degree from the University of Cambridge, a Master of Music degree from the University of London and a PhD from Cambridge. She held a research fellowship at Emmanuel College, Cambridge from 1995 until 1999 and a lectureship at Lancaster University before joining the University of Manchester as a Senior Lecturer in 2006. She was appointed as a fellow of the British Academy in 2019.

Herissone is a council member of the Royal Musical Association and sits on the Editorial Board for the journal Music & Letters.

References

1971 births
Living people
English musicologists
Fellows of the British Academy
Alumni of the University of Cambridge
Alumni of the University of London
Academics of the University of Manchester
Fellows of the Higher Education Academy